Vanikoro striatus is a species of very small sea snail, a marine gastropod mollusk in the family Vanikoridae.

Description

Distribution

References

External links

Vanikoridae
Gastropods described in 1842